Siegfried Johannes Gottwald (30 March 1943 – 20 September 2015) was a German mathematician, logician and historian of science.

Life and work
Gottwald was born in Limbach, Saxony in 1943.  From 1961 to 1966, he studied mathematics at the University of Leipzig, where he was awarded his doctor title in 1969 and his habilitation in 1977.

He was tenured professor of non-classical and mathematical logic at the University of Leipzig where he taught from 1972 to his retirement in 2008. His main research areas are fuzzy sets and fuzzy methodologies, many-valued logic and the history of mathematics.

He published several books on many-valued logic and on fuzzy sets and their applications, a co-authored textbook on calculus, and a reader in the history of logic. He also contributed to the German biographical dictionary of mathematicians, Lexikon berühmter Mathematiker.

Gottwald was Deputy Dean of the Faculty of Social Sciences and Philosophy at University of Leipzig for several years. He was married with three children.

Published books
 
S. Gottwald, P. Günther, K. Beyer, V. Wünsch: Grundkurs Analysis. Parts 1–4, Math.-Naturwiss. Bibl., Vols. 53–56, Teubner: Leipzig 1972–74.

References

External links
Biography

1943 births
2015 deaths
People from Limbach-Oberfrohna
20th-century German mathematicians
21st-century German mathematicians
Mathematical logicians
Academic staff of Leipzig University
Leipzig University alumni
Historians of science